is a flatland-style Japanese castle located in Tsuchiura, southern Ibaraki Prefecture, Japan. At the end of the Edo period, Tsuchiura Castle was home to the Tsuchiya clan, daimyō of Tsuchiura Domain.

History 
The early history of Tsuchiura Castle is not clear, and per folklore the original castle was founded in the Heian period by Taira no Masakado. During the Sengoku period, the area around Tsuchiura was controlled by the Oda clan, who were later destroyed by the Yūki clan. After the Battle of Sekigahara, and the establishment of the Tokugawa shogunate, the Yūki were relocated to Fukui Domain in Echizen Province and a portion of their vacated domain was given to Matsudaira Nobukazu as a reward for his rear-guard action in the Battle of Sekigahara. His son, Matsudaira Nobuyoshi, laid out the foundations of the castle town and built a number of gates on the Mito Kaidō highway linking Edo with Mito.

During the early Edo period, the castle passed through a number of hands until it came under the control of the Tsuchiya clan in 1669. The Tsuchiya ruled until the Meiji restoration, except for one hiatus of five years.

After the Meiji Restoration, per government order, the fortifications of the castle were dismantled and most of its moats were filled in. The central bailey with the ex-daimyo palace was used as a government office until it burned down in 1884. A new office building was completed; however, in 1899 the central bailey and second bailey were donated to the city and became Kijo Park. Only one yagura remains from the Edo period, the Taiko Yagura Mon, which was built in 1656.

Literature

External links

 Tsuchiura Castle Jcastle Profile
 Japanese Castle Explorer

Castles in Ibaraki Prefecture
Hitachi Province